Sciapus maritimus is a species of long-legged fly in the family Dolichopodidae.

References

Sciapodinae
Insects described in 1918
Taxa named by Theodor Becker